Pelee Island Winery is a winery in Kingsville, Ontario, Canada.

At just under 42 degrees North, Pelee Island is at a latitude similar to that of Rioja, Spain, Porto, Portugal, Provence, France, and Tuscany, Italy.  It is Canada’s most southerly inhabited point, and has a longer growing season than any other wine region in Canada. The island, in Lake Erie, is 25 kilometres from the mainland.  Harvest is early, with picking usually beginning at the end of August. Late-harvest grapes are often in by mid-October.

Sustainable Winemaking Ontario 
Pelee Island Winery has is a founding member and is designated a Sustainable Winemaking Ontario winery and vineyard and grow and care for each vine to specifications strictly outline by the World Wildlife Fund's strict Sustainable Vineyard practice. https://winecountryontario.ca/sustainability-wco/   

This means limited and controlled pesticide spraying and use of a 100% island grown natural fertilizer; sorghum grass.

Terroir 
With heat units and frost free days unmatched anywhere else in Canada, the island is a natural destination for Vinifera grape growing. Soil type is Toledo clay with a limestone base found two to ten feet from the surface. The soils are well developed and highly calcareous indicative of very good fertility and intense biological activity. The ideal vineyards are located at the centre of the island where deeper soils encourage and ensure properly set root systems, as much of the island is concave and below the surface of Lake Erie drainage pipes expel excessive rainfall. This excess water is carried into the island’s century old dyke system. Winds off the lake ensure consistent and proper air flow through the vineyards, limiting humidity and possible fungus diseases. https://winecountryontario.ca/region/lake-erie-north-shore/

Grapes
White varietals include: CHARDONNAY | GEWURZTRAMINER | RIESLING | SAUVIGNON BLANC | VIDAL | PINOT GRIS | TOKAY FRIULANO

Red varietals include: MERLOT | PINOT NOIR | CABERNET SAUVIGNON | CABERNET FRANC | BACO NOIR | SHIRAZ | TEMPRANILLO | CHAMBOURCIN | GAMAY | ZWEIGELT | LEMBERGER

Wines
Pelee Island Winery produces a wide variety of grape wines. A selection of over 50 wines with most of them bearing the VQA Ontario mark.  Product lines include: VQA Core Line, Reserve VQA, Vinedressers, LOLA, Bella, Hopping Apple Sparkling, Lighthouse, J.S. Hamilton, Monarch and others. White, red, blush, and sparkling.

Pelee Island Winery Kingsville 
Winery facility along with a retail boutique, tours and tastings, outdoor terrace and banquet facility.

Pelee Island Winery Pelee Island 
Winery pavilion with retail, tours and tastings, large outdoor patio grounds and deli hut.

References
Wine Country Ontario https://winecountryontario.ca/

VQA Ontario https://www.vqaontario.ca/Home

External links
Pelee Island Winery

Wineries of Ontario
Essex County, Ontario